The first series of Survivor, commonly referred to as Survivor: Pulau Tiga, premiered on 21 May 2001 and ran until 25 July 2001. The series was presented by journalist Mark Austin, who was on location with the contestants, and television presenter John Leslie, who conducted exit interviews with the players and presented additional footage of events. It consisted of 40 days of gameplay with 16 castaways competing for a prize of £1,000,000.

The sixteen contestants were initially separated into two tribes, named Helang and Ular, meaning "eagle" and "snake" in Malaysian, respectively. On Day 20, the ten remaining players merged into one tribe, named Sekutu, the Malaysian word for "together". The final nine players remaining made up the final two players and the seven members of the jury, who ultimately decided who would be the "Ultimate Survivor". After 40 days of competition, police officer Charlotte Hoborough was named the "Ultimate Survivor", defeating airline industry purchaser Jackie Carey in a 7-0 jury vote.

Production
The series premiered on ITV on 21 May 2001. The programme initially aired 4 times a week. An hour-long show aired on Mondays and Wednesdays which showed the highlights from the island with presenter Mark Austin. On Tuesdays and Thursdays, a studio show presented by John Leslie aired. This programme included an interview with the castaway voted off the previous episode and included unseen footage from the island. Billboards were allotted around the UK displaying the slogan "You Don't Win, You Survive". The billboards created confusion amongst viewers as it misled them into thinking people would die throughout the game. Executive producer Nigel Lythgoe complained to Heat magazine about the decision. He said: "The tagline when I left for Borneo was 'Trust No One', which is great. When I got back it was, 'You Don't Win, You Survive'. Well, you did win – you won a million pounds! And of course you survive, because we're not going to let you die."

Contestants
There were 16 contestants, divided into two tribes, Helang and Ular. After six contestants were eliminated, the tribes were merged to form one tribe, Sekutu. The final seven eliminated contestants made up the jury that decided who would be the winner.

Season summary

Voting history

Notes

Ratings
The series was perceived as being not very popular with UK viewers. Despite Survivor receiving initial media hype, the debut episode opened with 6.6 million viewers, which was seen as a disappointment for ITV. Despite the figures, an ITV spokesperson said: "We couldn't have hoped for anything better. We never expected 10m on the first night although we hope it will build to this. You have got to remember that we introduced 16 strangers and a complicated gameshow to the audience and we are confident it will grow. It's already a massive talking point, making the front pages."

Ratings for the series then dropped to an average of 5 million, which was half of the audience that the network had expected. In response, ITV made the decision to transmit less episodes per week to allow the hype for the series to grow. However, their change failed to have an impact on viewing figures. Nevertheless, the finale of the first series garnered 7.7 million viewers, peaking at 9 million. Despite being low in ratings by ITV's expectations, Survivor was the most watched reality television series in the UK at its time of airing, such as Big Brother. After the first series had concluded, Julia Lamaison, ITV's Head of Strategy, admitted that the network were too hopeful with their expectations for the series. They had hoped for a series average of 12 million viewers, accrediting their hopefulness to the success of the series in America. Lamaison also admitted that ITV had not supported Survivor enough in the first series, particularly with the time
slot and the scheduling.

References

2001 British television seasons
United Kingdom
Television shows filmed in Malaysia